Friedrich X, Count of Hohenzollern (died 21 June 1412), nicknamed Friedrich the Younger or the Black Count was a German nobleman.  He was a ruling Count of Hohenzollern.

Life 
Friedrich was the eldest son of Count Friedrich IX of Hohenzollern from his marriage to Adelheid (d. after 1385), a daughter of Count Burchard V of Hohenberg-Wildenberg.

In 1381, he concluded a military alliance with Duke Leopold III of Austria. In 1386, Friedrich X fought on the Austrian side in the Battle of Sempach. He later mediated between Austria and the free imperial cities in Swabia and Franconia.

In 1408, Friedrich became the senior member of the House of Hohenzollern.  In this rôle, he looked after the internal affairs of the dynasty and kept the peace between its various branches.

Friedrich married Anna (d. 1421), a daughter of Count Burchard IX of Hohenberg-Nagold.  The marriage remained childless.  Consequently, the line of "Black Counts" founded by his father, died out with Friedrich's death.  He bequeathed most of his estate to his cousin Friedrich XII.  Anna, Friedrich's widow, became prioress of Reuthin.

References 
 Graf Rudolph Stillfried-Alcántara and Traugott Maercker: Hohenzollerische Forschungen, C. Reimarus, 1847, p. 186 ff

Counts of Hohenzollern
14th-century births
1412 deaths
Year of birth unknown
14th-century German nobility